John Griscom (September 27, 1774 – February 26, 1852) was an early American lecturer and educator, and one of the first American educators to teach chemistry.

Biography
John Griscom was born in Hancock's Bridge, New Jersey on September 27, 1774.

He taught at Queens College (now Rutgers University) from 1812–28, and at Columbia College.  He founded New York's first anti-poverty organization, the New York Society for the Prevention of Pauperism. He also opened the New York High School in 1825, the first monitorial system school in New York. In 1836, he was elected as a member to the American Philosophical Society.

He died in Burlington, New Jersey on February 26, 1852.

References

External links
 Memoir of John Griscom (1859)

1774 births
1852 deaths
Rutgers University faculty
Columbia University faculty
American chemists
Environmental health practitioners